Ellerby is a village and civil parish in the Scarborough 
district of North Yorkshire, England, located within the North York Moors National Park.

According to the 2001 UK census, Ellerby parish had a population of 30. The population remained less than 100 at the 2011 census. Details were included in the civil parish of Mickleby.

References

External links

Villages in North Yorkshire
Civil parishes in North Yorkshire